Honest Love and True is a 1938 Fleischer Studios animated short film starring Betty Boop and her erstwhile boyfriend Fearless Freddy.

This is the last in a series of Betty Boop melodrama spoofs, which also included She Wronged Him Right (1934), Betty Boop's Prize Show (1934) and No! No! A Thousand Times No!! (1935).

Plot

The plotline—as much as can be determined from surviving materials—features Betty as a poor singer working in a Klondike saloon, with Freddie as her Mountie defender.

References

External links
Honest Love and True at the Big Cartoon Database.

1938 films
Betty Boop cartoons
1930s American animated films
American black-and-white films
1938 animated films
Paramount Pictures short films
Fleischer Studios short films
Short films directed by Dave Fleischer
Films about singers
Films set in Yukon